Loch Langavat is the name of several freshwater lochs in the Outer Hebrides of Scotland. The name is a Gaelic rendition of Old Norse lang "long" and vatn, meaning "lake".

Most of these lochs are on the island of  Lewis and Harris

Loch Langavat is a loch in the Ness district of Lewis. It lies midway between the Butt of Lewis and Tolsta Head, 12 miles (19 km) northeast of Stornoway. 
Loch Langabhat is the biggest freshwater loch on Lewis. It is over 7 miles long and at the head of the Grimersta system, with spectacular scenery and frequent sightings of golden eagles and red deer. The loch is fished for salmon and brown trout.
Loch Langabhat is a small loch north of Carlabhagh, Lewis.
Loch Langabhat is a small loch northwest of Gress, Lewis.
Loch Langabhat is a loch about 700 m long west of Amhuinnsuidhe, Harris.

According to Sinclair (1890), John Macaulay,  known as Iain Ruadh MacDhughaill, "was celebrated as a hunter. He was drowned in Loch Langabhat whilst swimming to an Island in the middle of that lake, an t-Eilaln Dubh. A large stone marks the spot on which his body was laid after it was taken out of the water. His bereaved mother used to visit this spot on almost every Wednesday of the year. He was born about the year 1600." It is not clear which of the Loch Langavats this incident refers to.

References 
 Murray, Sir John and Pullar, Laurence (1908) Bathymetrical Survey of the Fresh-Water Lochs of Scotland, 1897-1909. London; Royal Geographical Society.
  Sinclair, Alexander Maclean (1890) The Gaelic bards : from 1411 to 1517 [i.e. 1715] Edinburgh;  J. Thin

Footnotes

Isle of Lewis
Langavat
Langavat
Langavat